The Anglo-African and The Weekly Anglo-African were periodicals published by African American abolitionist brothers Thomas Hamilton (1823–1865) and Robert Hamilton (1819–1870) in New York City during the American Civil War era. For a short period, one paper was also named the Pine and Palm.

History
Thomas and Robert Hamilton were the sons of abolitionist and founder of the New York African Society for Mutual Relief William Hamilton. The elder Hamilton lived through the 1834 anti-abolitionist riots in New York and was critical of pacifist abolitionist newspapers like The Liberator. 

The two brothers held similar views, and they founded The Anglo-African Magazine, a monthly, in January 1859. It had 32 pages and cost one dollar for a yearly subscription. The Hamiltons founded the Weekly Anglo-African six months afterwards. The newspaper and magazine were the first publications to run Martin Delany's serialized novel, Blake; or the Huts of America. Robert managed the magazine, while Thomas used his expertise as a reporter and journalist. The weekly's contributors included Martin Delany, Mary Ann Shadd Cary, Edward Wilmot Blyden, and Sarah Mapps Douglass. William B. Gould also served as a financial backer and reporter for The Anglo-African. The newspaper ran with four pages of text at four cents per copy. Its motto was, "Man must be free; if not through the law, then above the law." The paper had early successes in its coverage of slavery resistance, the Dred Scott v. Sandford case, and the Raid on Harpers Ferry. Its correspondents and subscribers stretched across the US, as well as Canada and Jamaica.

The Anglo-African Magazine was published until March 1860 and the Weekly Anglo-African until March 1861. Due to financial troubles, the Hamiltons sold the weekly newspaper to George Lawrence, Jr., and James Redpath, who renamed it to The Palm and Pine. The Hamilton brothers quickly saw that, under its new owners, the newspaper would no longer serve the needs of the black community. Robert Hamilton, therefore, decided to start a new newspaper, also named the Weekly Anglo-African. Its first issue was published in July 1861.

Legacy
Lost issues of the Weekly Anglo-African were uncovered in the Black Abolitionist Papers Project.

References

Bibliography
 
 
 
 
 
 

Newspapers published in New York City
Abolitionist newspapers published in the United States
African-American newspapers
Publications disestablished in 1865
African-American history in New York City
Defunct newspapers published in New York City